Cook Islands competed at the 2019 Pacific Games in Apia, Samoa from 7 to 20 July 2019. The country participated in 15 sports at the 2019 games.

Athletics

Basketball

5x5

Men's basketball
 TBC

Women's basketball
 TBC

3x3

Men
 TBC

Women
 TBC

Football

Men's football

Squad
TBC

Women's football

Squad
TBC

Golf

Cook Islands nominated five men and seven women for the tournament in Samoa, with one and three respectively to be omitted. The men's and women's teams will each have four players participating in the 2019 games.

Men
 Royle Brogan
 Daniel Webb
 Kristopher Williamson
 Ned Howard
 James Herman

Women
 Memory Akama
 Rotana Howard
 Rowena Newbigging
 Katey Karati
 Margaret Teiti
 Matai Karati
 Moeroa Mamanu-Matheson

Lawn bowls

Netball

Outrigger canoeing

Rugby league nines

Men's rugby league
 TBC

Women's rugby league
 TBC

Rugby sevens

Men's sevens

Women's sevens

Sailing

Swimming

Tennis

Triathlon

Volleyball

Beach volleyball

Weightlifting

References

Nations at the 2019 Pacific Games
2019